Elizabeth Ortega-Toro (née Ortega; born August 26, 1977) is an American politician and labor executive who is a member of the California State Assembly from the 20th district since 2022. A member of the Democratic Party, her district includes the southern East Bay of the San Francisco Bay Area.

Born in Guadalajara, Ortega immigrated to the United States at age three and was raised in Oakland. She has a bachelor of science from the University of Phoenix. She served as the statewide political director for AFSCME Local 3299 before becoming the first Latina elected to serve as the executive secretary-treasurer of the Alameda Labor Council, a central labor council that represents all labor unions in Alameda County.

Ortega was first elected to the Assembly in 2022, defeating Dublin City Councilmember Shawn Kumagai. She assumed office on December 5, 2022.

Early life and education 
Ortega was born in Mexico on August 26, 1977. Her family is from the Guadalajara area. Ortega immigrated to the United States at age three with her mother and brother; her father had already immigrated to the United States. They crossed the border in San Diego and moved to the Fruitvale neighborhood of Oakland, where Ortega was raised and attended public school.

Ortega attended the University of Phoenix at its Oakland campus. She graduated with a bachelor of science in criminal justice administration in 2009.

Labor career 
Ortega began her labor career as a receptionist for SEIU in 2001. She later became an education trainer for SEIU and was eventually promoted to assistant director of Education and Nursing Homes. In 2011, she became political director for the Alameda Labor Council, an AFL-CIO-affiliated central labor council that represents all labor unions in Alameda County, from 2011 to 2013.

In 2013, Ortega joined AFSCME Local 3299 as its statewide political director. As statewide political director, she was based in Sacramento and lobbied the California State Legislature for the successful passage of legislation to protect essential service jobs at all University of California campuses.

Ortega returned to the Alameda Labor Council in 2017 as its Executive Secretary-Treasurer. She was the first Latina to serve in that position.

California State Assembly

Tenure 
Ortega was sworn in on December 5, 2022. She represents the 20th district, which includes the Alameda County communities of San Leandro, Union City, Hayward, Castro Valley, San Lorenzo, Cherryland, Ashland, and parts of Dublin and Pleasanton.

Elections

2022

Personal life 
Ortega is married to Jason Toro, a former San Leandro school board trustee, whom she married in 2000. They have four children together and live in San Leandro.

Bankruptcy 
In 2010, Ortega filed for personal bankruptcy in the Northern District of California. She claimed $431,450 in assets and $628,558 in liabilities, as well as student loan debts and debts to the Internal Revenue Service and Chase Bank.

In 2018, the State of California claimed a $16,614.23 tax lien against Ortega.

References 

1977 births
American Federation of State, County and Municipal Employees people
American women trade unionists
American politicians of Mexican descent
Hispanic and Latino American women in politics
California Democrats
Democratic Party members of the California State Assembly
Living people
Hispanic and Latino American state legislators in California
Mexican emigrants to the United States
Mexican-American people in California politics
People from Guadalajara, Jalisco
San Francisco Bay Area politicians
Service Employees International Union people
Trade unionists from California
University of Phoenix alumni
Women in California politics